Deutsche Welle ("German Wave" in English), abbreviated to DW, is a German public, state-owned international broadcaster funded by the German federal tax budget. The service is available in 32 languages. DW's satellite television service consists of channels in English, German, Spanish, Persian and Arabic. The work of DW is regulated by the Deutsche Welle Act, meaning that content is intended to be independent of government influence. DW is a member of the European Broadcasting Union (EBU).

DW offers regularly updated articles on its news website and runs its own center for international media development, DW Akademie. The broadcaster's stated goals are to produce reliable news coverage, provide access to the German language, and promote understanding between peoples. It is also a provider of live streaming world news which can be viewed via its website, YouTube, and various mobile devices and digital media players.

DW has been broadcasting since 1953. It is headquartered in Bonn, where its radio programmes are produced. However, television broadcasts are produced almost entirely in Berlin. Both locations create content for DW's news website. As of 2020, Deutsche Welle has 1,668 employees (annual average). In total, over 4,000 distinct people of over 140 nationalities work in DW's offices in Bonn and Berlin, as well as at other locations worldwide.

History

Beginnings 
DW's first shortwave broadcast took place on 3 May 1953 with an address by the then West German President, Theodor Heuss. On 11 June 1953, ARD public broadcasters signed an agreement to share responsibility for Deutsche Welle. At first, it was controlled by Nordwestdeutscher Rundfunk (NWDR). In 1955, NWDR split into Norddeutscher Rundfunk (NDR) and Westdeutscher Rundfunk (WDR), WDR assumed responsibility for Deutsche Welle programming. In 1960, Deutsche Welle became an independent public body after a court ruled that while broadcasting to Germany was a state matter, broadcasting from Germany was part of the federal government's foreign-affairs function. On 7 June 1962, DW joined ARD as a national broadcasting station. Deutsche Welle was originally headquartered in the West German city of Cologne. After reunification, when much of the government relocated to Berlin, the station's headquarters moved to Bonn.

German reunification 
With German reunification in 1990, Radio Berlin International (RBI), East Germany's international broadcaster ceased to exist. Some of the RBI staff joined Deutsche Welle and DW inherited some broadcasting facilities, including transmitting facilities at Nauen, as well as RBI's frequencies.

DW (TV) began as RIAS-TV, a television station launched by the West Berlin broadcaster RIAS (Radio in the American Sector / Rundfunk im amerikanischen Sektor) in August 1988; they also acquired the German Educational Television Network in the United States. The rein  of the Berlin Wall the following year and German reunification in 1990 meant that RIAS-TV was to be closed down. On 1 April 1992, Deutsche Welle inherited the RIAS-TV broadcast facilities, using them to start a German- and English-language television channel broadcast via satellite, DW (TV), adding a short Spanish broadcast segment the following year. In 1995, it began 24-hour operation (12 hours German, 10 hours English, 2 hours Spanish). At that time, DW (TV) introduced a new news studio and a new logo.

Deutsche Welle took some of the former independent radio broadcasting service Deutschlandfunk's foreign-language programming in 1993, when Deutschlandfunk was absorbed into the new Deutschlandradio.

In addition to radio and television programming, DW sponsored some published material. For example, the South-Asia Department published German Heritage: A Series Written for the South Asia Programme in 1967 and in 1984 published African Writers on the Air. Both publications were transcripts of DW programming.

Internet presence 
In September 1994, Deutsche Welle was the first public broadcaster in Germany with an internet presence, initially www-dw.gmd.de, hosted by the GMD Information Technology Research Center. For its first two years, the site listed little more than contact addresses, although DW's News Journal was broadcast in RealAudio from Real's server beginning in 1995, and Süddeutsche Zeitungs initial web presence, which included news articles from the newspaper, shared the site. In 1996, it evolved into a news website using the URL dwelle.de; in 2001, the URL changed to www.dw-world.de, and was changed again in 2012, to www.dw.de. Deutsche Welle purchased the domain dw.com, which previously belonged to DiamondWare, in 2013; DW had attempted to claim ownership of the address in 2000, without success. DW eventually moved to the www.dw.com domain on 22 June 2015. According to DW, their website delivers information by topic with an intuitive navigation organized to meet users' expectations. The layout offers more flexibility to feature pictures, videos and in-depth reporting on the day's events in a multimedia and multilingual fashion. They also integrated their Media Center into the dw.de website making it easier for users to access videos, audios and picture galleries from DW's multimedia archive of reports, programs and coverage of special issues.

DW's news site is in seven core languages (Arabic, Chinese, English, German, Spanish, Portuguese for Brazil, and Russian), as well as a mixture of news and information in 23 other languages in which Deutsche Welle broadcasts. Persian became the site's eighth focus language in 2007.

German and European news is DW's central focus, but the site also offers background information about Germany and German language courses. Deutsch, Warum Nicht? (literally: German, Why Not?) is a personal course for learning the German language, created by Deutsche Welle and the Goethe-Institut.

In 2003, the German government passed a new "Deutsche Welle Act", which defined DW as a tri-media organization, making the Deutsche Welle website an equal partner with DW-TV and DW Radio. The website is available in 30 languages, but focuses on German, English, Spanish, Russian, Brazilian Portuguese, Chinese, and Arabic. Persian became the eighth focus language in 2007.

In March 2009, DW-TV expanded its television services in Asia with two new channels, namely DW-TV Asia and DW-TV Asia+. DW-TV Asia (DW-TV Asien in German) contains 16 hours of German programming and 8 hours in English, whilst DW-TV Asia+ contains 18 hours of English programmes plus 6 hours of German programmes.

In August 2009, DW-TV's carriage in the United Kingdom on Sky channel 794 ceased, although the channel continues to be available via other European satellites receivable in the UK.

In 2011, DW announced a major reduction of service including the closure of most of its FM services in the Balkans (except for Romani), but that it would expand its network of FM partners in Africa. The radio production for Hausa, Kiswahili, French, and Portuguese for Africa were optimized for FM broadcasts and DW also produces a regional radio magazine daily in English, to be rebroadcast by partners in Africa.

Audio content in Arabic is distributed online, via mobile, or rebroadcast by partners.

DW announced it would focus on FM partnerships for Bengali, Urdu, Dari/Pashtu, and Indonesian for South Asia, India, Pakistan, and Afghanistan.

On 1 November 2011, DW discontinued shortwave broadcasts in German, Russian, Persian, and Indonesian and ended its English service outside Africa. Chinese programming was reduced from 120 minutes to 60 minutes a week. As of November 2011, DW only broadcast radio programming via shortwave in: Amharic, Chinese, Dari, English and French for Africa, Hausa, Kiswahili, Pashtu, Portuguese for Africa and Urdu.

The budget of the Deutsche Welle for 2016 was 301.8 million euros.

On 25 February 2018, DW-TV published "The Climate Cover Up – Big Oil's Campaign of Deception" (2018) after documents confirmed big oil companies have known the burning of fossil fuels impacts climate since 1957.

Funding 

Deutsche Welle is funded from federal grants taken from the federal tax revenue.

Since the reorganisation of broadcasting as a result of German reunification, Deutsche Welle has been the only remaining broadcasting corporation under federal law. In contrast to the national public broadcasters, which are financed by the license fee the ARD state broadcasters, Deutschlandradio and ZDF, it is not financed through the broadcasting fee, but from federal taxes. The Ministry for Culture and Media is responsible for the financing, which in turn allows the DW to offer a broadcast with the low to nonexistent advertising time.

Rebranding television news 
On 22 June 2015, DW TV launched a 24-hour English-language news channel with a new design and a new studio as part of a rebrand to DW News. Previously, DW's news programmes were called Journal and broadcast in English in 3-, 15- and 30-minute blocks. The new channel offers 30-minute updates every hour and 60-minute programmes twice a day on weekdays. DW News broadcasts from Berlin but frequently has live social media segments hosted from a specially-designed studio in Bonn. The German, Spanish, and Arabic channels also received a new design.

At the same time, DW's news website moved from a .de URL to .com and added a social media stream to its front page. The refreshed DW services were launched under the tagline 'Made for Minds'.

Plans for the future 
Deutsche Welle has developed a two-tier approach that they are using for future growth of their company which consists of a global approach and a regional approach. Within their global approach, DW has now made plans to boost its competitiveness market throughout the world with news and television coverage. The plan implements covering mostly all regions of the world with two television channels in each region. With some exclusions, the entire world will be covered. Hours covered ranges throughout regions and the coverage will be in German, English, Spanish, and Arabic.

The regional approach looks at marketing over the internet to offer news coverage in languages other than the 4 being offered. With updates on DW's website news will be better tailored to each region. Over time, their plan is to diversify their online coverage with more regional content being covered.

Censorship 
On 10 April 2019, DW announced that Venezuela's state telecoms regulator Conatel had halted its Spanish-language channel. By 15 April, the broadcasting service was restored.

In 2019, the Russian Ministry of Foreign Affairs accused DW of calling on Russians to take part in recent anti-government protests, and threatened it would take action against the outlet under domestic law if it made such calls again. Shortly after, Russia's parliament accused DW of breaking election legislation and asked the foreign ministry to consider revoking the German broadcaster's right to work in the country. By November, Russian Foreign Minister Sergei Lavrov declared he did not support banning foreign media outlets.

On 3 February 2022, in retaliation to Germany's broadcasting regulator's decision to ban transmission of the Russian state-run RT Deutsch channel over a lack of a broadcasting license, the Russian foreign ministry said that it would shut down DW's Moscow bureau, strip all DW staff of their accreditation and terminate broadcasting of DW in Russia. It also stated that it would begin the procedure of designating DW as a "foreign agent".

The Moscow office of Deutsche Welle was informed that it would be shut at 9:00 on Friday, 4 February 2022. DW made plans to relocate Moscow operations to the Latvian capital, Riga.

On 30 June 2022, DW has been banned in Turkey upon the request of Radio and Television Supreme Council (RTÜK). RTÜK ordered DW in February 2022 to pay the license fee or to terminate their service in Turkey.

Logos

Broadcast languages 

 * partly by Deutschlandfunk (until 1993)

Shortwave relay stations

Shortwave relay stations outside Germany 
 Trincomalee, Sri Lanka (1984 to 2013) sold to Sri Lanka Broadcasting Cooperation
 3 × 250 kW shortwave transmitters
 1 × 400 kW mediumwave transmitter
 20 antennas (to be verified)
 Kigali, Rwanda: A relay station in Kigali, Rwanda, was inaugurated on 30 August 1963, and provided coverage for Africa. This relay station closed 28 March 2015.
 4 × 250 kW shortwave transmitters
 Sines, Portugal closed on 30 October 2011 and was due to be dismantled after a few months.
 3 × 250 kW shortwave transmitters
 Radio Antilles, Montserrat

DW used a relay station in Malta that had three SW and one 600 kW-MW transmitter and gave partial coverage of the Americas, Southern Asia and the Far East. It was inaugurated on 29 July 1974 in exchange for a grant of almost 1 million GBP. The station closed in January 1996.

Formerly, DW shared a transmitting station on Antigua in the Caribbean with the BBC. It was inaugurated on 1 November 1976 and closed on 31 March 2005. It had a relay-exchange with the Canadian Broadcasting Corporation that allowed DW to use two 250 kW transmitters in Sackville, New Brunswick until that facility closed down in 2012.

In July 2011 Deutsche Welle began implementing a major reform. The main changes have been a radical reduction of shortwave radio broadcasting—from a daily total of 260 to 55 hours—and an expansion of television broadcasting.

Relay stations leasing transmitter time to DW 

In 2013, DW leased time on the following relay stations:
 Woofferton, United Kingdom (BBC World Service)
 Kranji, Singapore (BBC Far Eastern Relay Station)
 Dhabayya, United Arab Emirates (United Emirates Radio)
 Nakhon Sawan, Thailand (BBC East Asian Relay Station)
 Ascension Island (BBC Atlantic Relay Station)
 Meyerton, South Africa (Sentech)

Personnel

Directors-General 

 12 October 1960 – 29 February 1968: 
 1 March 1968 – 29 February 1980: Walter Steigner
 1 March 1980 – 8 December 1980: Conrad Ahlers
 19 December 1980 – 30 June 1981: Heinz Fellhauer (interim)
 1 July 1981 – 30 June 1987: Klaus Schütz
 1 July 1987 – 30 June 1989: Heinz Fellhauer
 1 July 1989 – 31 March 2001: Dieter Weirich
 1 April 2001 – 30 September 2001: Reinhard Hartstein (interim as deputy intendant)
 1 October 2001 – 30 September 2013: 
 1 October 2013–present: Peter Limbourg

Presenters 
 Tim Sebastian
 Sarah Kelly
 Phil Gayle
 Brent Goff

DW Akademie 
DW Akademie is Deutsche Welle's international center for media development, media consulting and journalism training. It offers training and consulting services to partners around the world. It works with broadcasters, media organizations, and universities especially in developing and transitioning countries to promote free and independent media. The work is funded mainly by the German Federal Ministry of Economic Cooperation and Development.
Additional sponsors are the German Foreign Office and the European Union.

DW Akademie's journalism traineeship is an 18-month program for young journalists that provides editorial training in the three areas in which Deutsche Welle produces content: radio, television and online. It is aimed at aspiring journalists from Germany as well as from regions to which Deutsche Welle broadcasts.

The "International Media Studies" Master's Program, offered in cooperation with the University of Bonn and the University Bonn-Rhein-Sieg of Applied Sciences, is based at DW Akademie. The four-semester program combines the disciplines of media development, media regulation, and communications. The seminars are held in English and German and the degree is aimed at media representatives from developing and transitioning countries.

Carsten von Nahmen became head of DW Akademie in September 2018. He had been DW's senior correspondent in Washington since February 2017 and prior to this, deputy editor-in-chief and head of DW's main news department since 2014. Christian Gramsch was director of DW Akademie from November 2013 until May 2018, and prior to this DW's regional director for multimedia. He succeeded DW Akademie director Gerda Meuer, who had previously been deputy editor-in-chief of Deutsche Welle's radio program, and had earlier worked for various media outlets and as a correspondent for Inter News service. Ute Schaeffer has been DW Akademie's deputy head since 2014 and was previously Deutsche Welle's editor-in-chief.

Learn German section 

Deutsche Welle's website has a section dedicated to providing material for those who are interested in learning the German language of all levels based on the Common European Framework of Reference for Languages. They offer free video and audio courses with access to exercises and transcripts. Users can also search for suitable courses and test which level they are at. Among the material available in their site, they offer free access to an animated series called "Harry Lost in Time" (Harry gefangen in der Zeit), for beginners. Through Flash animation, the series tells the story of a fictional character named Harry Walkott, a man who is struck by lightning in the Black Forest during his vacation in Germany and, because of this, becomes stuck in time, with the same day repeating over and over. With an English narration, the series introduces German expressions, words and grammar explanations, and also provides exercises to the user.

Antisemitism controversies 
In November 2021, Süddeutsche Zeitung published an investigation into social media comments allegedly made by members of DW's Arabic service, including posts that appeared to downplay the Holocaust or perpetuate anti-Jewish stereotypes. On 3 December 2021, DW announced that it was suspending four employees and one freelancer during an external investigation, to be led by former German Justice Minister Sabine Leutheusser-Schnarrenberger and psychologist Ahmad Mansour, into the allegations. On 7 February, this investigation concluded that DW was correct to suspend these five employees, and recommended further action against eight other employees; it also recommended ending cooperation agreements with some Middle East-based news outlets, but concluded that there was no "structural antisemitism" at DW. Following the report, DW terminated the contracts of several other employees, including the former bureau chief in Beirut, who advocated the execution of  "[a]nyone who has to do with the Israelis"; an employee who claimed that Israel controls people's brains "through art, media and music"; and a third journalist had posted "the Holocaust is a lie." Several of those fired stated that they had not been given a chance to defend their case, criticized DW's lack of clarity regarding guidelines for what constituted antisemitism, and said they felt they were being censored in what they could write about the Israeli-Palestinian conflict.

In September 2022, Farah Maraqa, one of seven Arab employees of DW fired in February, subsequently sued DW and won her case. The court ruled that her dismissal on charges of anti-Semitism was "legally unjustified". A former colleague, Maram Salem, won her case in July against DW for unlawful termination, ruling that her Facebook posts were not anti-Semitic.

Also in September 2022, Deutsche Welle updated its Code of Conduct to include "Germany's historical responsibility for the Holocaust is also a reason for which we support the right of Israel to exist" among their values and noted antisemitism is grounds for dismissal. The updated code of conduct is thought to improve Deutsche Welle's chances of successfully terminating antisemitic employees in the future.

On 5 December 2021, Deutsche Welle announced that it would suspend its partnership with a Jordanian partner, Roya TV, on account of antisemitic content published on Roya's social media. Guido Baumhauer, a senior executive with DW, apologized, saying: "We are truly sorry that we did not notice these disgusting images." Roya TV rejected the accusation and said it was the target of "hostile campaign" by unnamed parties.

These moves came on the back of reporting from The Guardian in January 2020, which raised allegations of "sexual harassment, racism, antisemitism, and severe bullying" within the organization.

See also 

 Euronews
 Karin Helmstaedt – DW presenter for the Euromaxx culture and lifestyle show
 Max Hofmann – Brussels Bureau Chief for DW in Belgium
 Television in Germany

Notes

References

Citations

Sources 

 McPhail, Thomas L. Global Communication: Theories, Stakeholders, and Trends. 2006, Blackwell Publishing. .
 Wallis, Roger, and Stanley J. Baran. The Known World of Broadcast News: International News and the Electronic Media. 1990, Routledge. .
 Wood, James. History of International Broadcasting. 2000, Institution of Engineering and Technology. .

External links 

 

1953 establishments in West Germany
24-hour television news channels in Germany
ARD (broadcaster)
Companies based in Bonn
German news websites
German radio networks
International broadcasters
Mass media in Bonn
Multilingual news services
Publicly funded broadcasters
Radio stations established in 1953
Media listed in Russia as foreign agents
Deutsche Welle
State media 
News and talk radio stations
Russian-language websites